Quercus kouangsiensis is an uncommon Asian species of trees in the beech family Fagaceae. It has been found only in southern China, in the Provinces of Guangdong, Guangxi, Hunan, and Yunnan. It is placed in subgenus Cerris, section Cyclobalanopsis.

Quercus kouangsiensis is a tree up to 15 meters tall. Leaves can be as much as 20 cm long.

References

External links
line drawing, Flora of China Illustrations vol. 4, fig. 393, drawings 9-10 at left

kouangsiensis
Flora of China
Plants described in 1937
Taxa named by Aimée Antoinette Camus